The 2007 European Speedway Club Champions' Cup.

Calendar

Semi-finals

Final

References 
 Świat Żużla - Sezon 2007, No 4 (42) /2007, page 62, 
 uem-online.org - Result

See also 

2007
European Club